Robert T. Motts was an American saloon owner and gambling racket leader, who established and managed Chicago's Pekin Theatre, an epicenter of African American theater. Motts was an organizer in the Republican Party. He also owned theaters in New York City. Motts' funeral was a major affair.

A court order in New York enjoined Motts' theaters from having a show that infringed on a similarly named show.

References

Year of birth missing
Year of death missing
People from Chicago
Saloonkeepers
Illinois Republicans